Paolo Todeschini (22 September 1920 – 30 March 1993) was an Italian professional footballer, who played as a midfielder, and football manager.

Honours

Club 
Napoli
Serie B: 1949–50

External links 
Profile at MagliaRossonera.it 

1920 births
1993 deaths
Italian footballers
Italian football managers
Association football midfielders
Serie A players
A.C. Milan players
Bologna F.C. 1909 players
Atalanta B.C. players
S.S. Lazio players
S.S.C. Napoli players
Palermo F.C. players
A.C. Monza players
Mantova 1911 players
Mantova 1911 managers
Modena F.C. managers
U.S. Salernitana 1919 managers
A.C. Milan managers
S.S. Lazio managers
Cosenza Calcio managers
Aurora Pro Patria 1919 managers
A.C.R. Messina managers
Serie A managers
Serie B managers
Serie C managers